Aigio railway station is a train station in Aigio in the northern Peloponnese, Greece. Since June 2020, it is served by trains to and from central Athens and Athens Airport via Kiato. The station is located on the outskirts of Aigio, 2 km from the town's centre.

History
Construction was completed several years after the suspension of regional services on the metre-gauge railways of the Peloponnese in 2011. After a series of test runs commencing in April 2019, railway traffic to and from Aigio had been expected to resume in August 2019. However, a series of delays meant that the opening of the section between Aigio and Kiato was postponed until June 2020. Services finally commenced on 22 June 2020. The trains currently in use between Aigio and Kiato are the Stadler GTW 2/6 diesel multiple units, constructed by Stadler Rail in 2003. The electrification of the section between Aigio and Kiato will allow direct services to and from Athens; in the meantime, passengers must change between diesel and electric trains at Kiato. Travel time between the two stations is 45 minutes for the express service and 53 minutes, including minor stops. In July 2022, the station began being served by Hellenic Train, the rebranded TranOSE.

Facilities
The station is equipped with waiting rooms, shelters, toilets and a cafe. There is also a staffed ticket office. Outside of the station there is a big parking lot (free parking). Currently, there are no local bus services connecting the station with the centre of Aigio. Road access to the station is provided by two narrow paved roads, which still need improvement (mainly widening and proper signage).

Services

Since 15 May 2022, this station serves the following routes:

Station layout

Gallery

See also
Corinth railway station
Patras railway station
Railway stations in Greece
Hellenic Railways Organization
Hellenic Train
Proastiakos

References

Railway stations in Achaea
Railway stations opened in 2020
2020 establishments in Greece